The United Nations Educational, Scientific and Cultural Organization (UNESCO) designates World Heritage Sites of outstanding universal value to cultural or natural heritage which  have been nominated by countries which are signatories to the UNESCO World Heritage Convention, established in 1972. Cultural heritage consists of monuments (such as architectural works, monumental sculptures, or inscriptions), groups of buildings, and sites (including archaeological sites). Natural features (consisting of physical and biological formations), geological and physiographical formations (including habitats of threatened species of animals and plants), and natural sites which are important from the point of view of science, conservation or natural beauty, are defined as natural heritage. The Kingdom of Norway accepted the convention on 12 May 1977, making its historical sites eligible for inclusion on the list. As of 2017, there are eight World Heritage Sites in Norway, including seven cultural sites and one natural site. There is one transnational site, the Struve Geodetic Arc, that is shared with nine other countries.

Norway's first two sites, Urnes Stave Church and Bryggen, were inscribed on the list at the 3rd session of the World Heritage Committee, held in Cairo and Luxor, Egypt in 1979. The latest inscription, the Rjukan–Notodden Industrial Heritage Site, was added to the list in 2015. In addition to its World Heritage Sites, Norway also maintains five properties on its tentative list, three of which are transnational nominations.



World Heritage Sites 
UNESCO lists sites under ten criteria; each entry must meet at least one of the criteria. Criteria i through vi are cultural, and vii through x are natural.

Tentative list
In addition to sites inscribed on the World Heritage List, member states can maintain a list of tentative sites that they may consider for nomination. Nominations for the World Heritage List are only accepted if the site was previously listed on the tentative list. As of 2019, Norway lists five properties on its tentative list.

References

 
Landmarks in Norway
Nature conservation in Norway
Tourist attractions in Norway
World Heritage Sites
Norway